Davis Airport may refer to:

 Davis Airport (Maryland) in Laytonsville, Maryland, United States (FAA: W50)
 Davis Airport (Michigan) in East Lansing, Michigan, United States (FAA: 2D8)
 Davis Airport (Oregon) in Gates, Oregon, United States (FAA: 6S4)

Other airports located in cities named Davis:
 University Airport in Davis, California, United States (FAA: EDU)
 Yolo County Airport in Davis, California, United States (FAA: 2Q3)

See also
 Davis Field (disambiguation)